Crystal Weekes González is a Puerto Rican taekwondo practitioner. She won one of the bronze medals in the women's middleweight event at the 2022 World Taekwondo Championships held in Guadalajara, Mexico.

Junior career 
Weekes is a two-time junior world champion and two-time junior Pan American champion.

Senior career 
At the 2016 Pan American Taekwondo Olympic Qualification Tournament she finished 2nd in the heavyweight division to earn a spot at the 2016 Olympics.

Personal life 
She is from New York City, but has a Puerto Rican grandfather.  She holds the nickname of "Bam Bam."

References 

Puerto Rican female taekwondo practitioners
Living people
Olympic taekwondo practitioners of Puerto Rico
Taekwondo practitioners at the 2016 Summer Olympics
1998 births
Taekwondo practitioners at the 2015 Pan American Games
Taekwondo practitioners at the 2019 Pan American Games
Pan American Games competitors for Puerto Rico
21st-century Puerto Rican women